Quartzolite or silexite is an intrusive igneous rock, in which the mineral quartz is more than 90% of the rock's felsic mineral content, with feldspar at up to 10%. Typically, quartz forms more than 60% of the rock, the rest being mostly feldspar although minor amounts of mica or amphibole may also be present. Quartzolite occurs as dykes, sills, veins, bosses and segregation masses; it is also found in association with greisen and pegmatite. Quartzolite is an extremely rare type of rock. No extrusive rock equivalent of quartzolite is known.

Synonyms
The use of the synonym "silexite" is discouraged because it is the French word for chert, which is a sedimentary rock. Other less common synonyms are "igneous quartz" and "peracidite".

Examples
 Chrastava, Czech Republic
 Crag Mountain, Northfield, Massachusetts, United States
 Jabal Hamra, Saudi Arabia
 Keivy, Kola Peninsula, Russia
 Lyon Mountain quadrangle, New York state, United States
 Moulting Pond, Newfoundland, Canada
 Qiabukanzhuota, China
 Saveh County, Iran
 Smaaland Cove, South Georgia 
 South Mountains, Arizona, United States
 Torrington, New South Wales, Australia

Formation
Some occurrences of quartzolite are unlikely to have an entirely igneous origin; for example, two types of quartzolite that are associated with deposits of topaz in and around the Mole Granite pluton in Torrington, NSW, are believed to have formed in different ways. One type forms dykes and sills in the granite and in the surrounding metamorphic rocks. The other type has remnants of an earlier granite texture and is found on the outer edges of part of the pluton.

References

Intrusive rocks